The Puno grass mouse (Akodon subfuscus)  is a species of rodent in the family Cricetidae.
It is found in Bolivia and Peru.

References

Musser, G. G. and M. D. Carleton. 2005. Superfamily Muroidea. pp. 894–1531 in Mammal Species of the World a Taxonomic and Geographic Reference. D. E. Wilson and D. M. Reeder eds. Johns Hopkins University Press, Baltimore.

Akodon
Mammals described in 1944
Taxonomy articles created by Polbot